Idalys Ortiz Bocourt (born 27 September 1989) is a Cuban judoka. She competed in the over 78 kg division at the 2008, 2012 and 2016 Olympics and won a medal on each occasion. She won the silver medal in the women's +78 kg event at the 2020 Summer Olympics held in Tokyo, Japan.

Career
Ortiz took up judo aged 10, and was included in the national team at 15. At the age of 18, she became the youngest Olympic medalist in the heavyweight category, winning a bronze medal in 2008. In 2013 and 2016, she was named Cuban Athlete of the Year.

Beijing Olympics
In her first match at the 2008 Olympic Games in Beijing, she stood against a big (170 lb) Egyptian judoka Samah Ramadan. Ramadan stayed and waited for an opportunity to use her, possibly only, technique of immobilizing her opponent by lying on top. During the match, Ortiz tried many techniques for ippon but none were successful, except for the last move just a few seconds before the end of the match, when Samah Ramadan was already tired.

In her second match in Beijing, Ortiz went against Janelle Shepherd from Australia. The match had a good tempo and ended quickly with Ortiz making an ippon (an okuri-eri-jime). In the third match, the semifinals, she went against later Olympic champion and controversial judoka Tong Wen from China. This was a close match full of action and could have gone either way. However, Wen won the match as one of Ortiz's techniques was counted as yuko. Ortiz won the bronze medal in her match against Dorjgotovyn Tserenkhand from Mongolia, winning with a nice ippon (O-goshi).

2012 Summer Olympics
At the 2012 Olympics, Ortiz won the gold medal.  She beat Adysângela Moniz with a tsuri-goshi in her first match.  She then beat Yelena Ivashchenko before avenging her 2008 defeat by Tong Wen, beating her with a te-guruma.  She then beat Mika Sugimoto in the final.  She was the first non-Asian winner of the heavyweight category, and the first Cuban judo gold medalist in 12 years.

At the 2015 Pan American Championships she beat Vanessa Zambotti in the final, having beaten Nina Cutro-Kelly in the semifinals.  It was one of 3 gold medals for Cuba.

2016 Summer Olympics
At the 2016 Olympics, Ortiz completed her medal collection, winning a silver medal.  She beat Kseniya Chibisova with a tawara-gaeshi, then Kim Min-Jeong with a yoko-shiho-gatame.  In the semifinal she beat Kanae Yamabe with a uki-goshi before losing the final to Émilie Andéol.  She finished the season ranked world number one, having won 5 IJF events along with her Olympic silver.

She won the bronze medal in the 2017 World Openweight Championships, beating Romane Dicko with a shime-waza.

In 2018, she won her first IJF title since 2016.  She was also part of the Cuba team that won 5 gold medals at the 2018 Pan American Championships.

Ortiz credits her success to hard training, 7 hours a day, and a regime that involves training against men, because of the few women in her weight category.

References

External links

 
 
 
 Idalis Ortiz on official Cuban web encyclopedia EcuRed (Spanish)

1989 births
Living people
Cuban female judoka
Judoka at the 2008 Summer Olympics
Judoka at the 2011 Pan American Games
Judoka at the 2012 Summer Olympics
Judoka at the 2015 Pan American Games
Judoka at the 2016 Summer Olympics
Judoka at the 2019 Pan American Games
Medalists at the 2008 Summer Olympics
Medalists at the 2012 Summer Olympics
Medalists at the 2016 Summer Olympics
Olympic gold medalists for Cuba
Olympic silver medalists for Cuba
Olympic bronze medalists for Cuba
Olympic judoka of Cuba
Olympic medalists in judo
Pan American Games gold medalists for Cuba
Pan American Games medalists in judo
People from Pinar del Río Province
Universiade medalists in judo
World judo champions
Universiade gold medalists for Cuba
Universiade silver medalists for Cuba
Medalists at the 2013 Summer Universiade
Medalists at the 2011 Pan American Games
Medalists at the 2015 Pan American Games
Medalists at the 2019 Pan American Games
Judoka at the 2020 Summer Olympics
Medalists at the 2020 Summer Olympics
20th-century Cuban women
21st-century Cuban women